Kostroma Airport  is an airport in Russia located 6 km northeast of Kostroma. It services propeller-driven transports.

Airlines and destinations

References

External links
 Kostroma Air Enterprise official website

Airports built in the Soviet Union
Airports in Kostroma Oblast